The 1990 Pepsi Canadian Junior Curling Championships were held in Sudbury, Ontario.

Men's

Teams

Standings

Results

Draw 1

Draw 2

Draw 3

Draw 5

Draw 7

Draw 8

Draw 9

Draw 10

Draw 11

Draw 12

Draw 13

Draw 14

Draw 16

Draw 18

Draw 19

Draw 21

Tiebreakers

Tiebreaker #1

Tiebreaker #2

Tiebreaker #3

Playoffs

Semifinal

Final

Women's

Teams

Standings

Results

Draw 1

Draw 2

Draw 4

Draw 6

Draw 7

Draw 8

Draw 9

Draw 10

Draw 11

Draw 12

Draw 13

Draw 14

Draw 15

Draw 17

Draw 20

Draw 22

Playoffs

Semifinal

Final

External links
Men's statistics
Women's statistics

Canadian Junior Curling Championships
Curling competitions in Greater Sudbury
Canadian Junior Curling Championships
1990 in Ontario